Zavat may refer to:
 Zavat-e Gharb
 Zavat-e Sharq